The Princess Casamassima is a novel by Henry James, first published as a serial in The Atlantic Monthly in 1885 and 1886 and then as a book in 1886. It is the story of an intelligent but confused young London bookbinder, Hyacinth Robinson, who becomes involved in radical politics and a terrorist assassination plot. The book is unusual in the Jamesian canon for dealing with such a violent political subject. But it is often paired with another novel published by James in the same year, The Bostonians, which is also concerned with political issues, though in a much less tragic manner.

Plot 

Amanda Pynsent, an impoverished seamstress, has adopted Hyacinth Robinson, the illegitimate son of her old friend Florentine Vivier, a French woman of less than sterling repute, and an English lord. Florentine had stabbed her lover to death several years ago, and Pinnie (as Miss Pynsent is nicknamed) takes Hyacinth to see her as she lies dying at Millbank prison. Hyacinth eventually learns that the dying woman is his mother and that she murdered his father.

Many years pass. Hyacinth, now a young man and a skilled bookbinder, meets revolutionary Paul Muniment and gets involved in radical politics. Hyacinth also has a coarse but lively girlfriend, Millicent Henning, and one night they go to the theatre. There Hyacinth meets the radiantly beautiful Princess Casamassima (Christina Light, from James' earlier novel, Roderick Hudson).

The Princess has become a revolutionary herself and now lives apart from her dull husband. Meanwhile, Hyacinth has committed himself to carrying out a terrorist assassination, though the exact time and place have not yet been specified to him. Hyacinth visits the Princess at her country home and tells her about his parents. When he returns to London, Hyacinth finds Pinnie dying. He comforts her in her final days, then travels to France and Italy on his small inheritance.

This trip completes Hyacinth's conversion to a love for the sinful but beautiful world, and away from violent revolution. Still, he does not attempt to escape his vow to carry out the assassination. But when the order comes, he turns the gun on himself instead of its intended victim.

Reception 

The Guardians review, published in 1887, noted that The Princess Casamassima kept to the promise of Roderick Hudson, which James's other novels had not met. The review praised James's characterisation of Hyacinth's friends and comrades, but nonetheless found that James "does not understand" the English, with the result that his characters are "rather extremely clever attempts and conjectures than real life studies." The review concluded: "there is a great deal of interest in the book, interest which is not lessened by the fact that its catastrophe is quite unexpected, or rather is one which most readers are likely not to expect, exactly because it is so obvious."

References

Further reading 

 The Novels of Henry James by Edward Wagenknecht (New York: Frederick Ungar Publishing Co., 1983) 
 A Henry James Encyclopedia by Robert Gale (New York: Greenwood Press, 1989) 
 Meaning in Henry James by Millicent Bell (Cambridge, MA: Harvard University Press 1991) 
 A Companion to Henry James Studies edited by Daniel Fogel (Westport, CT: Greenwood Press 1993) 
 Henry James: A Collection of Critical Essays edited by Ruth Yeazell (Englewood Cliffs, NJ: Prentice Hall 1994)

External links

 Original magazine publication of The Princess Casamassima (1885-86)
 First book version of The Princess Casamassima (1886)
 Author's preface to the New York Edition version of The Princess Casamassima (1908)
 Note on the various texts of The Princess Casamassima at the Library of America web site
 

1886 British novels
1886 American novels
Novels by Henry James
Novels first published in serial form
Works originally published in The Atlantic (magazine)
Macmillan Publishers books